Chinchpokli Assembly constituency was one of the 288 assembly constituencies of  Maharashtra a western state of India. Chinchpokli was also part of Mumbai South Lok Sabha constituency. Chinchpokli existed till 2004 elections until Byculla Assembly constituency was formed in 2008.

Member of Legislative Assembly

 1978: Kaviskar Suhas Tulaji, Independent
 1980: Shaikh Shamim Ahmed, Indian National Congress (I)
 1985: B. D. Zute, Indian National Congress
 1990: B. D. Zute, Indian National Congress
 1995: Faiyaz Ahmed, Janata Dal
 1999: Madhu Chavan, Indian National Congress
 2004: Arun Gawli, Akhil Bharatiya Sena

See also

 Chinchpokli
 South Mumbai
 List of constituencies of Maharashtra Legislative Assembly

References

 

Assembly constituencies of Mumbai
Mumbai
Mumbai City district
Former assembly constituencies of Maharashtra